Rio Novo, Minas Gerais is a municipality in the state of Minas Gerais in the Southeast region of Brazil.
Part of Presidente Itamar Franco Airport is within the municipality, the remainder being in Goianá.

See also
List of municipalities in Minas Gerais

References

Municipalities in Minas Gerais